Atom Bomb is an album by The Blind Boys of Alabama, released in 2005.

Track listing
 "(Jesus Hits Like the) Atom Bomb" – 2:27
 "Demons" – 4:30 (featuring Gift of Gab)
 "Talk About Suffering" – 4:13
 "I Know I've Been Converted" – 2:41
 "Old Blind Barnabas" – 3:31
 "Spirit in the Sky" – 3:04
 "Faith & Grace" – 3:07
 "New Born Soul" – 2:54
 "Presence of the Lord" – 4:59
 "Moses" – 3:55

Awards
In 2006, the album won a Dove Award for Traditional Gospel Album of the Year at the 37th GMA Dove Awards.

References

External links

2005 albums
The Blind Boys of Alabama albums
Real World Records albums